Narghota is a small village under  Kajlot panchayat situated  southwest of  Dharamshala in Himachal Pradesh, India.

The village is home for handful of families (mostly Rajputs) who take pride in their tradition of serving in defense services. The village is virtually rebuilt after it was destroyed, without any fatalities, in a 1986 earthquake.

Points of attraction 
Surrounding Tea Gardens 
Kunal Pathri Temple

References

Villages in Kangra district